James Aubrey Martensz  (25 September 1885 – 26 March 1963) was a Ceylonese lawyer and politician.

James Aubrey Martensz was born 25 September 1885, the oldest son, in a family of twelve, to James Andries Martensz (a planter) and Edith Maud née de Saram. He was the grandson of James Adrianus Martensz, a member of the Legislative Council of Ceylon. He received his education at Royal College, Colombo and then at the Ceylon Law College, where he qualified as a Proctor. Marthensz served for a number of years as the private secretary to Justice Wendt and in 1908 was admitted to the bar. He then joined the legal firm of F. J. & G. de Saram, eventually becoming a senior partner in the firm. He was created a Justice of the Peace and Unofficial magistrate.

Following Ceylon's first parliamentary elections in 1947, Martensz was appointed as a member of the Ceylon House of Representatives. He was one of six members appointed by the Governor-General, to represent important interests which were not represented or inadequately represented in the House. He officiated as Deputy Chairman of Committees between October 1947 and December 1948, and on one occasion as Speaker of the House. He remained a member of parliament until January 1949, when he was appointed as Ceylon's first High Commissioner in Australia.

In 1952, he was awarded the Commander of the Order of the British Empire. He subsequently became Dean of the Diplomatic Corps in 1952.

In 1957 he was elected as president of the Dutch Burgher Union of Ceylon, a position in which he served until 1959.

Martensz emigrated to Australia in 1959 and died in Canberra on 26 March 1963.

See also 
Sri Lankan Non Career Diplomats

References

1885 births
Alumni of Royal College, Colombo
Alumni of Ceylon Law College
Burgher lawyers
Burgher politicians
Sri Lankan Justices of the Peace and Unofficial magistrates
Ceylonese proctors
Ceylonese Commanders of the Order of the British Empire
Deputy chairmen of committees of the Parliament of Sri Lanka
Members of the 1st Parliament of Ceylon
High Commissioners of Sri Lanka to Australia
1963 deaths